"Doctor, My Eyes" is a 1972 song written and performed by Jackson Browne and included on his debut album Jackson Browne. Featuring a combination of an upbeat piano riff coupled with lyrics about feeling world-weary, the song was a surprise hit, reaching number 8 on the Billboard Hot 100 in spring 1972, after debuting on the chart at number 80. Browne would not see the chart's Top 10 again until 1982's soundtrack hit "Somebody's Baby", although "Running on Empty" just missed the Top 10, reaching number 11. Billboard ranked "Doctor My Eyes" as the No. 92 song for 1972.  In Canada, the song peaked at number four.

"Doctor, My Eyes" became a concert mainstay for Browne, and was included on both his later compilation albums. A live version can be found on the 1996 Australia CD release Best of... Live, a double set with Looking East, and the 1997 Japan 2-CD release of Best of... Live, coupled with The Next Voice You Hear: The Best of Jackson Browne.

Jesse Ed Davis played the electric guitar while David Crosby and Graham Nash sang backing vocals. Russ Kunkel played drums and Leland Sklar played bass. Kunkel and Sklar reunited with Browne in May 2021 to rerecord "Doctor My Eyes" for a charity project.

History
William Ruhlmann on Allmusic.com elaborated on the development of the song: "Browne first recorded a demo of 'Doctor My Eyes' for the Criterion Music publishing company in early 1971, and despite its striking imagery and carefully crafted writing, it was a bleak song... By the time he came to record the song for his first album in the summer of 1971, however, Browne had revised the lyric, tossing out the most pessimistic lines. Now, 'Doctor My Eyes' was the statement of a man who had stoically endured life's hardships, but having done so, now worried that he had been rendered unable to feel anything. It still wasn't an optimistic song, but the unhappy ending had been rendered ambiguous." Ruhlmann addresses the final recorded version's "paradoxical sense" between the music and the lyrics: "Working with other musicians, Browne drastically altered the sound of the song on record. A lively 4/4 beat, played on drums and congas, and supported by piano, set up a catchy underlying riff before the lyrics even began. Browne's singing was supported by Graham Nash and David Crosby's harmonies, giving the lyrics an emotional edge. On the whole, the arrangement and performance worked against the still desperate message contained in the words."
There was originally a third verse to the song, but it was not retained when Browne recorded the song for his debut album. The lost verse, however, can be found on circulating bootlegs of the song's original demo.

In part 1 of the 2013 documentary History of the Eagles, JD Souther and Glenn Frey discuss at some length the process of Browne's work methods while Browne was working on the song over a period of some months. The three lived in adjacent downmarket apartments; Frey would hear Browne, through the walls, at work on his piano every morning.

Reception
Jeff Walker, in his review of Browne's debut album for Phonograph Record magazine in 1972, wrote that "Doctor My Eyes" is one of a number of tracks on the album that "deal with a spiritual search; no preaching, no conclusions, just searching."  Cash Box described it as a "the eye-opener to bring talented singer/songwriter to AM attention'" going on to say that "harmonies are great, but it's Browne tune and show all the way."

Ruhlmann on Allmusic called it "a rollicking pop/rock song about being almost terminally burnt out."

Cover versions 
The Jackson 5 recorded "Doctor My Eyes" for inclusion on their sixth album Lookin' Through the Windows, released in 1972. Their version was also released as a single. It did not chart in the US, but went top 10 in the UK.

Chart performance

References

Songs about physicians
1972 debut singles
Jackson Browne songs
The Jackson 5 songs
Songs written by Jackson Browne
1972 songs
Asylum Records singles
Song recordings produced by Jackson Browne